Clarence "Pete" Gracey (December 18, 1910 – December 5, 2000) was an American football player who was an All-American center for the Vanderbilt Commodores football team of Vanderbilt University.

Early years
Gracey was born in Franklin, Tennessee.

Vanderbilt University
He enrolled at Vanderbilt University in nearby Nashville, Tennessee in 1929, where, after an undefeated season on the freshman team, he played for coach Dan McGugin's Vanderbilt Commodores varsity football team from 1930 to 1932.  He was a two-year starter at center for McGugin's Commodores, and the team compiled a three-year win-loss-tie record of 19–7–2 during his college career.

1931
Gracey said "In my first varsity year, the night before we played Georgia Tech, Coach McGugin casually walked up to me in the lobby of our hotel, put his arm around my shoulder and sorta whispered, "I was with some Atlanta newspapermen this afternoon and I told them you were the finest sophomore center I had ever coached. I hope that I haven't made it embarrassing for you" We beat Tech, 49 to 7. Afterward I talked to seven other players and you know, Coach McGugin told them all the same thing he told me."

1932
After leading the Commodores to a 6–1–2 record as a senior in 1932, he was a first-team All-Southern selection and was recognized as a consensus first-team All-American, when he received first-team honors from the New York World-Telegram and United Press (UP), and second-team accolades from the Associated Press (AP), International News Service (INS), Newspaper Enterprise Association (NEA), and the New York Sun. The Commodores and rival Volunteers fought to a scoreless tie. "Considering that we lost such a valuable player as Pete Gracey so early in the game, I thought that Vanderbilt was very fortunate in getting out with a tie" said McGugin.

See also 

 Vanderbilt Commodores
 List of Vanderbilt University people

References

Bibliography

1910 births
2000 deaths
All-American college football players
American football centers
People from Franklin, Tennessee
Vanderbilt Commodores football players
All-Southern college football players
Players of American football from Tennessee